Kanda may refer to:

People
Kanda (surname)
Kanda Bongo Man (born 1955), Congolese soukous musician

Places
Kanda, Tokyo, an area in Chiyoda-ku, Tokyo, Japan
Kanda Station (Tokyo), a railway station in Chiyoda-ku, Tokyo
Kanda River, a river in Tokyo, Japan
Kanda, Fukuoka, a town in Fukuoka Prefecture, Japan, in which the southern half of Kitakyushu Airport is located
Kanda Station (Fukuoka), a train station in Kanda, Fukuoka
Kanda, Bajhang, Nepal
Kanda, Bajura, Nepal
Kanda, Rapti, Nepal
Kanda, Uttarakhand, a town in Uttarakhand, India
Kanda, a town in Ngounié Province, Gabon
Kanda Estates, a residential development in Accra, Ghana
Kanda, Mohács, Hungary

Other uses
Kanda (lineage), a lineage and often ruling house or dynasty among the BaKongo specifically during the Kingdom of Kongo
Kanda language, also known as Angoram
Kanda Shrine, a landmark in Tokyo
Kanda Matsuri, a Japanese festival that takes place in Kanda, Tokyo
Kanda University of International Studies, a university in Chiba, Japan
Kanda or kenda, common names for the plant Macaranga peltata
, a Sanskrit word meaning "chapter", used in the names of the chapters of some Hindu books, e.g. the Ramayana, Shatapatha Brahmana etc.

See also
Khand (disambiguation)
Kenda (disambiguation)
Khonds